Reuven Hadinatov (also "Hadinotav"; born September 23, 1969) is an Israeli former Olympic weightlifter.

He immigrated to Israel, and is Jewish.

Weightlifting career
He competed for Israel at the 1992 Summer Olympics in Barcelona, at the age of 22, in  Weightlifting--Men's Featherweight (60 kg), and came in 15th with a total lift of 267.5 kg. He came in 9th in the snatch (270 pounds—122.5 kg), and 18th in the clean and jerk (320 pounds—145.0 kg). When he competed in the Olympics, he weighed 132 lbs (60 kg).

References 

Living people
American emigrants to Israel
Israeli male weightlifters
1969 births
Israeli Jews
Jewish weightlifters
Weightlifters at the 1992 Summer Olympics
Olympic weightlifters of Israel